Norihiro Tsuru (都留教博) is a Japanese violinist and composer. He has composed the scores to several anime series, including The Heroic Legend of Arslan, Mermaid's Forest and Mermaid's Scar. 

He released his first album "月をつくった男" in 1989. He also organized the New-age music group Acoustic Cafe in 1990 (not related to the American radio programme Acoustic Café).

Acoustic Café is composed of cellist Ayako, pianist Rie Nishimoto and violinist and keyboardist Norihiro Tsuru.

Perhaps his best-known standalone piece is Last Carnival, a bittersweet work in G-minor for violin, cello and piano.

Recordings 
 Acoustic Café: For Your Loneliness (2001)
 Acoustic Café: For Your Memories (2003)
 more recordings

References 

Japanese composers
Japanese male composers
Japanese violinists
Living people
New-age composers
21st-century violinists
21st-century Japanese male musicians
Year of birth missing (living people)